Nidularium fulgens is a plant species in the genus Nidularium. This species is endemic to Brazil.

Cultivars
 Nidularium 'Chantrieri'
 Nidularium 'Digeneum'
 Nidularium 'Francois Spae'
 Nidularium 'Madame Robert Morobe'
 Nidularium 'Orange Bract'
 × Nidumea 'Margaret J'
 × Niduregelia 'Ch. Chevalier'
 × Niduregelia 'Garnet'
 × Niduregelia 'Golden Vulkan'
 × Niduregelia 'Marechalii'
 × Niduregelia 'Something Special'
 × Niduregelia 'Southern Cross'
 × Niduregelia 'Sunset'
 × Niduregelia 'Thor'

References

BSI Cultivar Registry Retrieved 11 October 2009

fulgens
Flora of Brazil